Musk mallow or musk-mallow may refer to the following plants from the family Malvaceae:
Abelmoschus moschatus, native to India
Malva alcea, native to southern and eastern Europe and southwestern Asia, also known as the Greater Musk-mallow
Malva moschata, native to Europe and southwestern Asia, also known as the Musk-mallow